Kjuklingen Nunatak is one of the Dwyer Nunataks, lying  east of Mount Gjeita in the Hansen Mountains of Antarctica. It was mapped and named Kjuklingen (the chicken) by Norwegian cartographers working from air photos taken by the Lars Christensen Expedition, 1936–37.

References

Nunataks of Kemp Land